Filippo Gibbone served as a bishop (1880–) in Eboli, Italy, and wrote a book on Saint Antonino Abate. It was published in 1885, and official name was, "Vita del santo abate Antonino di Campagna." In addition to being a hagiographer Filippo was also Cantor and earned his doctorate in theology.

References

Bishops of Naples
1903 deaths
1880 births
20th-century Italian Roman Catholic bishops